Quine is a Manx surname. Notable people with the surname include:

Dan Quine (born 1967) British computer scientist
Don Quine  (born 1938), American actor and writer, founder of Professional Karate Association
Edgar Quine (born 1934), Manx politician
John Quine (1857-1940), Manx clergyman, scholar and writer, The Captain of the Parish
Richard Quine (1920–1989), American actor and film director
Robert Quine (1942–2004), American guitarist
Willard Van Orman Quine (1908–2000), American analytic philosopher and logician
William Edward Quine (1847–1922), American physician and academic

See also
Quinn (disambiguation)

Surnames
Surnames of Manx origin